Hugh Maitland Campbell (1914 – 10 July 2002) was an Australian philatelist who was added to the Roll of Distinguished Philatelists in 1969.

Campbell was a specialist in the stamps and postal history of the Australian states.

References

Signatories to the Roll of Distinguished Philatelists
1914 births
2002 deaths
Australian philatelists
Philately of Australia